Over the Wire is a 1921 American silent drama film directed by Wesley Ruggles and starring Alice Lake, Alan Roscoe and Alan Hale.

Cast
 Alice Lake as 	Kathleen Dexter
 Alan Roscoe as John Grannan 
 George Stewart as 	Terry Dexter
 Alan Hale as 	James Twyford

References

Bibliography
 Connelly, Robert B. The Silents: Silent Feature Films, 1910-36, Volume 40, Issue 2. December Press, 1998.
 Munden, Kenneth White. The American Film Institute Catalog of Motion Pictures Produced in the United States, Part 1. University of California Press, 1997.

External links
 

1921 films
1921 drama films
1920s English-language films
American silent feature films
Silent American drama films
American black-and-white films
Films directed by Wesley Ruggles
Metro Pictures films
1920s American films